Matthew James Hall (born 30 October 1981) is a former English cricketer.  Hall was a right-handed batsman who bowled right-arm medium pace.  He was born at Chesterfield, Derbyshire.

Hall represented the Derbyshire Cricket Board in 2 List A matches against Derbyshire in the 2000 NatWest Trophy and Bedfordshire in 1st round of the 2002 Cheltenham & Gloucester Trophy which was held in 2001.  In his 2 List A matches, he scored 15 runs at a batting average of 7.50, with a high score of 8.

References

External links
Matthew Hall at Cricinfo
Matthew Hall at CricketArchive

1981 births
Living people
Cricketers from Chesterfield, Derbyshire
English cricketers
Derbyshire Cricket Board cricketers